Mieczysław Paweł Nowicki (born 26 January 1951, in Piątek) is a retired road bicycle racer from Poland, who represented his native country at the 1976 Summer Olympics in Montreal, Quebec, Canada. There he won the bronze medal in the men's individual road race behind Sweden's Bernt Johansson and Italy's Giuseppe Martinelli. In the men's road team trial he won the silver medal with the Polish team. He also competed at the 1972 Summer Olympics. In 1973 he set a Polish national hour record of 42.231 km, a record that stood for over 40 years until it was broken by Andrzej Bartkiewicz in 2014.

References

External links
 databaseOlympics
 

1951 births
Living people
Polish male cyclists
Cyclists at the 1972 Summer Olympics
Cyclists at the 1976 Summer Olympics
Olympic cyclists of Poland
Olympic silver medalists for Poland
Olympic bronze medalists for Poland
People from Łęczna County
Olympic medalists in cycling
Sportspeople from Lublin Voivodeship
Polish politicians
Medalists at the 1976 Summer Olympics
UCI Road World Champions (elite men)